This article lists the 179 direct grant grammar schools that existed in England and Wales between 1945 and 1976.

Early departures from the scheme
A total of 164 schools were accepted onto the scheme when it opened in 1945.
Of these, three schools were no longer on the list in 1965:
 Kensington High School closed its senior school in 1948, becoming Kensington Preparatory School.
 King Edward VI School, Southampton remained an LEA-maintained grammar school until it became independent in 1979.
 Magdalen College School, Brackley remained an LEA-maintained grammar school until it merged with Brackley High School and Brackley Secondary Modern School to form a comprehensive in 1973.
Five schools left the scheme between 1968 and 1974:
 Trinity School of John Whitgift (Church of England, Boys), Croydon became independent in 1968, but continued to take LEA-funded pupils.
 Oakham School (CE, Boys), Rutland became independent in 1970 and co-educational in the following year.
 Queen Victoria High School (Girls), Stockton-on-Tees merged with The Cleveland School in 1970, forming Teesside High School.
 St Joseph's Convent School (Roman Catholic, Girls), West Hartlepool merged into the new English Martyrs' Comprehensive School in 1973.
 Convent of Notre Dame High School for Girls (RC), Standishgate, Wigan closed in 1974.

Schools remaining at the time of abolition
When the scheme was abolished in 1976, the remaining 174 schools either opted for independence or applied to join the state system, though some applications were refused.
The following table gives the outcome for these schools since 1976.
Starred names indicate the 18 schools that were added when the list was re-opened between 1958 and 1961.

Key:

GSDT=Girls' Day School Trust

HMC=Headmasters' and Headmistresses' Conference

References

Direct grant
Direct grant
Direct grant